Chioma Mang (born c.1961), is a Nigerian lawyer and corporate executive, who serves as the managing director and chief executive officer of United Bank for Africa Uganda Limited, effective December 2020. Prior to her current position, she served as the managing director and CEO of United Bank for Africa's subsidiary in Gabon.

Background and education
She was born in Nigeria circa 1961. She holds a Bachelor of Laws degree, obtained from the University of Reading, in the United Kingdom. Her degree of Master of Laws was awarded by the University College London, in 1988. She also obtained professional legal training at the Nigerian Law School and was admitted to the Nigerian Bar in 1990.

Career
In 1990, after admission to the Bar in Nigeria, she joined Midas Merchant Bank. Later, she transferred to Chartered Bank, working there in marketing and operations. In 1999, she joined the UBA Group. After working in various capacities, she was appointed CEO of the UBA subsidiary in Liberia, in 2011. In 2016, she was transferred to Gabon, in the same capacity.

As CEO of UBA Gabon, she led that bank's response to the COVID-19 outbreak in the country. UBA Gabon, donated CFA90 million (€137,000), to the country's pandemic fund, being the first commercial bank to do so.

In July 2020, Mang was appointed to replace Johnson Agoreyo who served as CEO at the Ugandan subsidiary from June 2016 until September 2020. Agoreyo is credited with turning around the loss-making Ugandan unit in 2017. UBA Uganda was also profitable in 2018 and 2019.

Family
Mrs Chioma Mang is a married Christian mother of three children.

References

External links
UBA appoints new managing director As of 17 July 2020.

Living people
1961 births
Nigerian women in business
Chief executive officers
Alumni of the University of London
Alumni of the University of Reading
Nigerian Law School alumni
United Bank for Africa
Residents of Lagos